Abortion Dream Team (ADT) is an abortion rights group in Poland. Headquartered in Warsaw, ADT was founded in October 2016. Volunteers with the group accept questions from women seeking abortion, and conduct workshops about how to administer mifepristone and misoprostol, a combination of drugs used in medical abortion.

ADT is part of an abortion underground that has existed since 1993, when the Polish Parliament passed a law greatly restricting abortion at the request of the Polish Catholic Church. The organization takes its name from the 1992 United States men's Olympic basketball team, nicknamed "the Dream Team," because the founders of ADT viewed themselves as among the most talented people in the field of reproductive rights.

ADT cofounder Justyna Wydrzyńska was charged with a crime in 2022 for shipping abortion pills to a pregnant woman in an abusive relationship who was begging for the pills. Wydrzyńska faces a possible a three-year prison sentence for helping with abortion. She is the first activist to be charged under the law.

The American organization Shout Your Abortion considers ADT a sister organization. After a 2022 leaked draft opinion that would overturn the American court decision Roe v. Wade, Kinga Jelinska of ADT observed that the legal status of abortion in the US is coming to resemble Poland.

References

Organisations based in Warsaw
2016 establishments in Poland
Abortion-rights organizations